The Buenaventura Classic  was a men's professional golf tournament held in Panama on PGA Tour Latinoamérica. The tournament was first held in 2014 on the Nicklaus Design Buenaventura Golf Club, the inaugural winner was Julián Etulain.

Winners

References

External links
Coverage on the PGA Tour Latinoamérica's official site

PGA Tour Latinoamérica events
Golf tournaments in Panama
Recurring sporting events established in 2014
Recurring sporting events disestablished in 2019
2014 establishments in Panama
2019 disestablishments in Panama